Cabindachelys is a genus of extinct sea turtles. The only known species is Cabindachelys landanensis.

Fossils 
A partial skull of the Cabindachelys has been found in Cabinda, Angola, by Timothy S. Myers, Michael J. Polcyn, Octávio Mateus, Diana P. Vineyard, A. O. Gonçalves, Louis L. Jacobs.

Habitat 
Cabindachelys lived in deep subtidal indents of the shores of Cabinda, Angola.

Etymology 
The name of Cabindachelys is a mixture of Cabinda the place where it lived and the Greek name for turtle.

Phylogeny

References 

Chelonioidea
Prehistoric turtle genera
Paleocene turtles
Fossil taxa described in 2017